Leo Lionni (May 5, 1910 – October 11, 1999) was an Italian-American writer and illustrator of children's books. Born in the Netherlands, he moved to Italy and lived there before moving to the United States in 1939, where he worked as an art director for several advertising agencies, and then for Fortune magazine. He returned to Italy in 1962 and started writing and illustrating children's books. In 1962, his book Inch by Inch was awarded the Lewis Carroll Shelf Award.

Family
Lionni was born in Amsterdam but spent two years in Philadelphia before moving to Italy during his teens. His father worked as an accountant and his mother was an opera singer. His father was assigned to an office in Italy part way through Leo's time in high school.  He married Nora Maffi, the daughter of Fabrizio Maffi, a founder of the Italian Communist Party, and they had two sons, Louis and Paolo, grandchildren Pippo and Annie and Sylvan, and great-grandchildren Madeline, Luca, Sam, Nick, Alix, Henry and Theo.

Leo Lionni died October 11, 1999, at his home in Tuscany, Italy, at the age of 89.

Career
From 1931 to 1939, he was a well-known and respected painter in Italy, where he worked in the Futurism and avant-garde styles. In 1935 he received a degree in economics from the University of Genoa. During the later part of this period, Lionni devoted himself more and more to advertising design.

In 1939, he moved to Philadelphia and began full-time work in advertising, at which he was extremely successful, acquiring accounts from Ford Motors and Chrysler Plymouth, among others. He commissioned art from Saul Steinberg, the then neophyte Andy Warhol, Alexander Calder, Willem de Kooning, and Fernand Léger. He was a member of the Advertising Art Hall of Fame.

In 1948, he accepted a position as art director for Fortune, which he held until 1960. He also maintained outside clients, designing The Family of Man catalogue design for the Museum of Modern Art, and was design director for Olivetti, for whom he produced ads, brochures and showroom design.

In 1960, he moved back to Italy, and began his career as a children's book author and illustrator. Lionni produced more than 40 children's books. He received the 1984 American Institute of Graphic Arts (A.I.G.A.) Gold Medal and was a four-time Caldecott Honor Winner—for Inch by Inch (1961), Swimmy (1964), Frederick (1968), and Alexander and the Wind-Up Mouse (1970). He also won the Deutscher Jugendliteraturpreis in 1965.

Over the course of his career, Lionni also held several teaching posts, beginning in 1946, when he taught advertising art at Black Mountain College. He also taught at Parsons School of Design in 1954; the Institute of Design in Ahmedabad, India, in 1967; the University of Illinois in 1967; and Cooper Union from 1982 to 1985.

Lionni always thought of himself as an artist. He worked in many disciplines including, especially, drawing, painting, sculpture and photography. He had one-man shows in the United States, Europe, Asia and the Middle East. He continued to work as an artist until just before his death in 1999.

Children's author and illustrator
Lionni became the first children's author/illustrator to use collage as the main medium for his illustrations. Reviewers such as Booklist and School Library Journal have said that Lionni's illustrations are "bold, sumptuous collages" that include "playful patches of color" and that his "beautifully simple [and] boldly graphic art [is] perfect to share with very young children."  Book World said that "the translucent color of the pictures and the simplicity of the text make a perfect combination." Many of Lionni's books deal with issues of community and creativity, and the existential condition, rendered as fables  which appealed to children. He participated in workshops with children and even after his death school children continue to honor him by making their own versions of his books.

Leo Lionni would usually draw pictures as he told stories to his grandchildren, but one time he found himself on a long train ride with no drawing materials. Instead, he tore out circles of yellow and blue from a magazine to help him tell the story he had in mind. This experience led him to create his first book for children, Little Blue and Little Yellow (1959).

Lionni uses earth tones in his illustrations that are close to the actual colors of the objects found in nature. In his book Inch by Inch, for example, he uses realistic shades of brown and burnt orange in his collage of a robin, while the tree branches are shades of brown with dark green leaves. Mice are consistently found as characters in Lionni's books, such as the star character in Frederick and the title character in the Caldecott Honor Book Alexander and the Wind-Up Mouse. Lionni's illustrations have been compared to those of Eric Carle as both often employ animals, birds, insects, and other creatures to tell a story about what it is to be human.

Parallel Botany
Among Lionni's books that were not intended for children, the best known is probably Parallel Botany (1978; first published in Italian as La botanica parallela, 1976). This detailed treatise on plants that lack materiality—in other words, imaginary plants—is richly illustrated with drawings of plants in charcoal or pencil and photographs of "parallel botanists". The text is a rich mix of plant descriptions, travel tales, "ancient" myths, and folk etymologies, leavened with historical facts and grounded in actual science. As an imaginary taxonomy, it is invoked by Italo Calvino as a precursor to the Codex Seraphinianus of Luigi Serafini.

Selected works
Alexander and the Wind-up Mouse
The Alphabet Tree
The Biggest House in the World
A Busy Year
A Color of His Own
Colors to Talk About
Cornelius: A Fable
An Extraordinary Egg
Fish is Fish
A Flea Story
Frederick (listed by the National Education Association as one of its "Teachers' Top 100 Books for Children" based on a 2007 online poll)
Geraldine, the Music Mouse
The Greentail Mouse
I Want to Stay Here! I Want to Go There!: A Flea Story
In the Rabbitgarden
Inch by Inch
It's Mine
Let's Make Rabbits: A Fable
Let's Play
Letters to Talk About
Little Blue and Little Yellow (a New York Times Best Illustrated Children's Book of the Year, 1959)
Matthew's Dream
Mouse Days: A Book of Seasons
Mr. McMouse
Nadarin
Nicolas, Where Have You Been?
Numbers to Talk About
On My Beach There are Many Pebbles
Parallel Botany
Pezzettino
Pulgada a Pulgada
Six Crows: A Fable
Swimmy (named by the National Education Association one of its "Teachers' Top 100 Books for Children" based on a 2007 online poll)
Theodore and the Talking Mushroom
Tico and the Golden Wings
Tillie and the Wall
Una Piedra Extraordinaria
What?: Pictures to Talk About
When?: Pictures to Talk About
Where?: Pictures to Talk About
Who?: Pictures to Talk About
Words to Talk About

References

External links 
Information from Random House
Leo Lionni posters, hosted by the University of North Texas Libraries Digital Collections
American Institute of Graphic Arts biography
Art Directors Club biography, portrait and images of work
 Eric Carle Museum of Picture Book Art
 Leo Lionni at Library of Congress Authorities — with 84 catalog records

1910 births
1999 deaths
Italian children's writers
Italian male writers
Italian artists
Jewish American artists
AIGA medalists
Italian expatriates in the Netherlands
Italian emigrants to the United States
Writers from Amsterdam
Black Mountain College faculty
20th-century American Jews